Carme Solé Vendrell (born Barcelona, 1944) is a Spanish illustrator and writer, mainly of children's books. Since 1968, she has illustrated more than a hundred books.  She has also worked on television series such as Víctor y María. She was a Premi Nacional de Cultura laureate in 1979 and 2012.

Between 2012 and 2015 her collection was deposited in the Biblioteca de Catalunya, consisting of about 400 drawings.

Awards
 1979: "Premi Nacional de Cultura"
 1993: "Premi Crítica Serra d'Or de Literatura Infantil i Juvenil" for her illustrations in Brrrrrgg! by Jaume Escala
 2006: Creu de Sant Jordi Award
 2012: "Premi Nacional de Cultura"

Selected works
 Raspall (1981)
 La lluna d'en Joan (1982)
 Jo les volia (1984)
 En Joan és molt petit (1990)
 Els nens del mar (1991)
 Magenta la petita fada (2003) ,

Works in English
Water Childrens Press Choice, 1984, 
Sally's story London : Blackie, 1984. ,

References

Sources 
 "Carme Solé Vendrell", por Jaime García Sobrino, en Nous voulons lire !, n° 104, junio de 1994, pp. 81–88.
 "Carme Solé Vendrell", en CLIJ, n° 60, abril de 1994, pp. 25–26.
 "Carme Solé i Vendrell" en Bookbird, n° 32-33, otoño de 1994, p. 48.

External links

Official website
Carme Solé Vendrell collection in the National Library of Catalonia

1944 births
Living people
Writers from Barcelona
20th-century Spanish writers
21st-century Spanish writers
Spanish children's writers
Spanish women children's writers
Spanish illustrators
Spanish women illustrators
Spanish children's book illustrators
20th-century Spanish women writers
21st-century Spanish women writers